LG Venus (model no. LG VX8800 (CDMA) or LG KF600 (GSM)) is a slider cell phone by LG Electronics. The phone has two screens: a regular one as well as a unique touchscreen pad on the bottom third of the front (called "InteractPad") which changes to suit the activity currently being done on the phone. It features a music player, Bluetooth capabilities, up to an 8 GB microSD slot, video messaging, speaker phone and voice command, among other features. It is considered by many to be a spiritual successor to LG's popular "Chocolate" line, which includes the previous LG Chocolate (VX8500) and LG Chocolate Spin (VX8550) handsets.

As part of the VX series, the VX8800 LG Venus was sold exclusively to Verizon Wireless in the United States. Pre-ordering began on November 8, 2007, and the release date for Verizon Wireless was November 19, 2007. On March 27, 2008, Telus Mobility announced that it would be made available through their stores and retail partners around mid-April. The GSM version of the Venus is the LG KF600, announced January 16, 2008 and released in March. It has an improved, 3.2-megapixel camera up from 2.0-megapixel on the VX8800.

See also
Samsung U900 Soul
Samsung E950
Sony Ericsson W580
LG Shine

References

External links 
PhoneArena
MobileBurn
Venus info at VerizonWireless.com
Featured in PCWorld.ca's round-up of Top Canadian Smartphones and Cell Phones

VX8800
Mobile phones introduced in 2007